Nekokat was an American synthpop band and supergroup that originated in Los Angeles, California. The band formed in 2015 and is composed of Jordan Witzigreuter of The Ready Set, Cameron Walker of Twin XL, and Jess Bowen of The Summer Set.

History
The band's name is a reference to the Japanese word for cat, neko. Singer Jordan Witzigreuter had thought of the name from big inflatable stage props he had on a tour.

Nekokat was formed in 2015, and consists of three members. Their first single, "Gimme A Break" was released in June 2015. According to guitarist Cameron Walker, the song started as a track idea Wiztigreuter made. The song was originally intended to be a track featuring Bowen on The Ready Set’s fifth studio album, I Will Be Nothing Without Your Love. The band released their debut EP, Communication that same month. The group premiered a music video for "The Reckless" in November 2015. In late 2015, the group released their second EP, Communication II.

In 2017 the group released a new single titled, "Melt". In September 2017, the group released another single titled, "Take" along with its music video. As a reaction to the Stoneman Douglas High School shooting in 2018, the group along with Switchfoot, Thrice, Copeland and many others, joined together to share a cover of Tom Petty's "I Won't Back Down" to the Parkland community during the annual Heavy and Light event. In June 2018, the band released their third and final EP, Pleasure Beach.

Musical style
Their musical style has been described as pop punk and electropop. The trio has cited inspiration from Saves The Day, Passion Pit and The Cure.

Band members
 Jordan Witzigreuter – lead vocals 
 Cameron Walker – vocals, guitar, bass 
 Jess Bowen – drums, percussion, backing vocals

Discography
Nekokat has released three EPs, ten singles and two music videos.

Extended Plays

Singles

Music videos

References

Synth-pop musicians